Silver may be used as an investment like other precious metals. It has been regarded as a form of money and store of value for more than 4,000 years, although it lost its role as legal tender in developed countries when the use of the silver standard came to a final end in 1935. Some countries mint bullion and collector coins, however, such as the American Silver Eagle with nominal face values. In 2009, the main demand for silver was for industrial applications (40%), jewellery, bullion coins, and exchange-traded products. In 2011, the global silver reserves amounted to 530,000 tonnes.

Collectors of silver and other precious metals who collect for the purpose of investment (either as their sole motivation or as one of several) are commonly nicknamed stackers, with their collections dubbed as stacks. The motivations for stacking silver varies between collectors.

Millions of Canadian Silver Maple Leaf coins and American Silver Eagle coins are purchased as investments each year. While these bullion coins are legal tender, they are rarely accepted by shops. However, "junk silver" coins, which were originally minted for circulation, can still be found in circulation, albeit rarely, and are common targets in the practice of coin roll hunting.

Price

The price of silver is driven by speculation and supply and demand, like most commodities. The price of silver is notoriously volatile compared to that of gold because of the smaller market, lower market liquidity and demand fluctuations between industrial and store of value uses. At times, this can cause wide-ranging valuations in the market, creating volatility.

Silver often tracks the gold price due to store of value demands, although the ratio can vary. The crustal ratio of silver to gold is 17.5:1. The gold/silver price ratio is often analyzed by traders, investors, and buyers. In Roman times, the price ratio was set at 12 (or 12.5) to 1. In 1792, the gold/silver price ratio was fixed by law in the United States at 15:1, which meant that one troy ounce of gold was worth 15 troy ounces of silver; a ratio of 15.5:1 was enacted in France in 1803. The average gold/silver price ratio during the 20th century, however, was 47:1.

The price of silver has risen fairly steeply since September 2005, being initially around $7 per troy ounce but reaching $14 per troy ounce for the first time by late April 2006, and the average price of the month was $12.61 per troy ounce. As of March 2008, it hovered around $20 per troy ounce. However, the price of silver plummeted 58% in October 2008, along with other metals and commodities, due to the effects of the credit crunch. By April 2011, silver had rebounded to reach a 31-year high at $49.21 per ounce on April 29, 2011 due to  concerns about monetary inflation and the solvency of governments in the developed world, particularly in the Eurozone.

Influences

The price of silver is influenced by a variety of factors.

 The silver market is considerably smaller than the gold market, with the London gold bullion market turns over 18 times more monetary value than silver. This allows a large trader or investor to influence the silver price either positively or negatively.
 Due to the properties of silver, it has a major role in the manufacturing of photovoltaics, RoHS compliant solder, clothing, and medical uses. Other new applications for silver include RFID tags, wood preservatives, water purification and food hygiene. Data from 2010 reveals that a majority of silver is being used for industry (487.4 million ounces), jewelry (167.0 million ounces), and investments (101.3 million ounces).
Silver, like all precious metals, may be used as a hedge against inflation, deflation or devaluation.
 Public sentiment regarding silver as a hedge against inflation may be influenced by marketing campaigns from silver producers and affiliates.

History

The highest recorded silver prices were:

1979–1980

In part due to the actions of the Hunt Brothers (Nelson Bunker Hunt, William Herbert Hunt, and Lamar Hunt), the price for silver Good Delivery Bars jumped from about $6 per troy ounce to a record high of $49.45 per troy ounce on January 18, 1980, representing an increase of 724%. The highest price of physical silver is hard to determine, but based on the price of common silver coins, it peaked at about $40/oz.

On January 7, 1980, in response to the Hunts' accumulation, the Commodity Exchange (COMEX) suddenly adopted "Silver Rule 7", placing heavy restrictions on the purchase of the commodity on margin, causing massive liquidations and enormous downward pressure on the price. The Hunt brothers had borrowed heavily to finance their purchases, and as the price began to fall again, dropping over 50% in just four days due to the sudden forced liquidation of margin positions, they became unable to meet their obligations, causing further panic in the precious metal markets.

The Hunts were never found guilty of any criminal wrongdoing, although they lost a civil suit in connection to the event. The event also cause the Hunts' fortune to dwindle, culminating in them filing for bankruptcy. In 1989, they agreed to a civil settlement with the Commodity Futures Trading Commission, paying out fines, and agreeing to a ban from trading commodities.

2010–2011
There was such immense risk to the world economy that investors drove the prices up by buying defensive commodities (e.g. silver or gold). When the short-term risks were believed to have subsided, many investors reallocated their assets back into yielding (dividend or interest) investments such as stocks or bonds.

The 2011 United States debt ceiling crisis was a major factor in the rise of silver prices. The 2010, U.S., midterm elections highlighted policy differences between President Obama vs. the Tea Party movement. The price of silver concurrently rose from $17 to $30 as the elections approached. In late 2010 and 2011, silver found a "new normal" between $25 and $30.

In 2011, Republicans in Congress demanded deficit reduction be part of legislation raising the nation's debt-ceiling. The resulting contention was resolved on 2 August 2011 by the Budget Control Act of 2011.

During the first few months of 2011, Moody's and S&P both downgraded the outlook on US finances; this was a major shock to the financial world and resulted in silver's climb to $50.

 On April 18, 2011, U.S.-based rating agency S&P issued a "negative" outlook on the U.S.'s "AAA" (highest quality) sovereign-debt rating for the first time since the rating agency began in 1860, indicating there was a one-in-three chance of an outright reduction in the rating over the next two years.
 On April 25, 2011, silver traded $49.80 per ounce in the New York spot market.

On August 5, 2011, S&P issued the first ever downgrade in the federal government's credit rating, citing their April warnings, the difficulty of bridging the parties and that the resulting agreement fell well short of the hoped-for comprehensive 'grand bargain'. The credit downgrade and debt ceiling debacle contributed to the Dow Jones Industrial Average falling nearly 2,000 points in late July and August. Following the downgrade itself, the DJIA had one of its worst days in history and fell 635 points on August 8.

Then as it became likely that U.S. Secretary of Treasury Timothy Geithner would order the treasury to use extraordinary measures to delay the crisis, silver settled back at $35. As the debacle continued during the summer, silver moved in the range of $33 to $43.

As it became clear that the "financial apocalypse" would be delayed by late summer, many investors dumped silver and commodities and moved back into U.S. equities. The price of silver quickly went back to $30 and declined below 2010 levels in the next few years.

Whether classifying silver's movement as a 'bubble' (seen when comparing silver with gold) has been debatable, with Peter Schiff denying that a bubble ever existed and asserting that the factors that led to the increase in the silver price have not yet been resolved.

Investment vehicles

Bars

A traditional way of investing in silver is by buying actual bullion bars. In some countries, like Switzerland and Liechtenstein, bullion bars can be bought or sold over the counter at major banks.

The flat, rectangular shape of silver bars makes them ideal for storage in a home safe, a safe deposit box at a bank, or placed in allocated (also known as non-fungible) or unallocated (fungible or pooled) storage with a bank or dealer.

Silver bars can either be cast or poured, or minted; both categories often involve the production of bars with intricate decorative designs that are attractive to collectors, often referred to as 'art bars'; these types of bars are often given as gifts.

Various sizes of silver bars are 1, 10, 100 and 1000 troy ounces, 100 gram (3.215 troy ounces) and one kilogram (32.15 troy ounces), as well as other sizes. There are various silver refiners with their own unique stamp or "hallmark" that is used to provide information about the bar and ensure quality.

Coins and rounds

Silver coins may be minted as either fine silver or junk silver. Fine silver coins minted by governments include the one-ounce, 99.99% Canadian Silver Maple Leaf and the 99.93% American Silver Eagle. Government-minted silver coins are legal tender, and often enjoy special taxation treatments. Fine silver rounds are produced by a variety of private mints.

The term junk silver signifies silver coins without a numismatic premium. In the United States, this is taken to mean pre-1964 90% silver dimes, quarters, and half-dollars; $1 face value of those circulated coins contains 0.715 troy ounce (22.2 grams) of fine silver. All 1965-1970 and some 1976 Kennedy half dollars are minted with a 40% silver composition. "War nickel" is the name given to certain 1942-1945 nickels minted with a 35% silver composition.

Other countries, such as Australia, Canada, Switzerland, and the United Kingdom also minted junk silver coins in the past. All three countries (except Switzerland) initially minted sterling silver coins for circulation, before the coins' silver content is reduced: Australia to 50% in 1946, Canada to 80% in 1920, and the United Kingdom to 50% near 1920.

Exchange-traded products
Silver exchange-traded products represent a quick and easy way for an investor to gain exposure to the silver price, without the inconvenience of storing physical bars. Silver ETPs include:
 iShares Silver Trust launched by iShares is the largest silver ETF on the market with over 340 million troy ounces of silver in storage.
 ETFS Physical Silver and ETFS Silver Trust launched by ETF Securities.
 Sprott Physical Silver Trust is a closed-end fund created by Sprott Asset Management. The initial public offering was completed on November 3, 2010.

Accounts
Most Swiss banks offer silver accounts where silver can be instantly bought or sold just like any foreign currency. Unlike holding physical silver, the customer has a claim against the bank for a certain quantity of metal. Digital gold currency providers and internet bullion exchanges, such as OneGold, BullionVault or GoldMoney, offer silver as an alternative to gold. Some of these companies allow investors to redeem their investment through the delivery of physical silver.

Derivatives, CFDs and spread betting
Derivatives, such as silver futures and options, currently trade on various exchanges around the world. In the U.S., silver futures are primarily traded on COMEX (Commodity Exchange), which is a subsidiary of the New York Mercantile Exchange. In November 2006, the National Commodity and Derivatives Exchange (NCDEX) in India introduced 5 kg silver futures.

Mining companies

These do not represent silver at all, but rather are shares in silver mining companies. Companies rarely mine silver alone, as normally silver is found within, or alongside, ore containing other metals, such as tin, lead, zinc or copper. Therefore, shares are also a base metal investment, rather than solely a silver investment. As with all mining shares, there are many other factors to take into account when evaluating the share price, other than simply the commodity price. Instead of personally selecting individual companies, some investors prefer spreading their risk by investing in precious metal mining mutual funds.

Taxation 

In many tax regimes, silver does not hold the special position that is often afforded to gold. For example, in the European Union the trading of recognized gold coins and bullion products is VAT exempt, but no such allowance is given to silver. This makes investment in silver coins or bullion less attractive for the private investor, due to the extra premium on purchases represented by the irrecoverable VAT (charged at 20% in the United Kingdom and 19% for bars and 7% for bullion products with face value, e.g. The US Silver Eagle and the Canadian Maple Leaf, in Germany). Norwegian companies can legally deliver free of VAT to the rest of Europe within certain annual limits or can arrange for local pickup.

Other taxes such as capital gains tax may apply for individuals depending on country of residence (tax status) and whether the asset is sold at increased nominal value. For example, in the United States, silver is taxed only when sold for a profit, at a special collectibles capital gain tax rate (the normal income tax rate, subject to a maximum of 28% for silver held over 1 year). In 2011, the Utah Legal Tender Act recognized U.S.-minted silver and gold coins as legal tender within Utah, so that they may be used to pay any debt in Utah without being subject to Utah's capital gains tax (although such a tax would still apply for federal tax purposes, as such a state law cannot override federal law).

See also
 Precious metals as an investment
 Gold as an investment
 Palladium as an investment
 Platinum as an investment
 Diamonds as an investment
 Full-reserve banking
 Metallism

References

External links
 Current London Silver Fixing by the London bullion market

Silver
Precious metals as investment
Commodities used as an investment
Security
Precious metals